EME may refer to:

Companies and organizations
 Edison Mission Energy, a defunct American power company
 Emcor, an American construction company
 College of Electrical and Mechanical Engineering, a constituent college of National University of Sciences and Technology, Pakistan
 Corps of Royal Canadian Electrical and Mechanical Engineers, of the Canadian Forces
 Indian Army Corps of EME, of Electronics and Mechanical Engineers
 Pakistan Army Corps of Electrical and Mechanical Engineering

Science
 ECB-mask-ECB, a block cipher mode of operation used for disk encryption
 EME (psychedelic), a drug
 Early myoclonic encephalopathy
 Earth–Moon–Earth communication
 Eigenmode expansion
 Electromagnetic environment
 Electromembrane extraction
 Early Medieval Europe (journal)

Other
 EME Temple, in Gujarat, India
 Encrypted Media Extensions, a W3C specification 
 Exempted Micro Enterprises